Glandirana is a genus of true frogs (family Ranidae) found in the East Asia (eastern China, Korea, Japan, and possibly Primorsky Krai in the Russian Far East). The name means ‘glandular frog’.

Glandirana is a genus split off from Rana. All species, except the recently described Glandirana susurra, were originally included in Rana; some of them have been placed in genus Rugosa, now synonymized with Glandirana. The monophyly of the genus has been questioned, but it is supported by recent molecular work. Glandirana seems to be a sister taxon of Hylarana.

At moment, the following species are included in the genus:
 Glandirana emeljanovi (Nikolskii, 1913)
 Glandirana minima (Ting and T'sai, 1979)
 Glandirana rugosa (Temminck and Schlegel, 1838)
 Glandirana susurra (Sekiya, Miura, and Ogata, 2012)
 Glandirana tientaiensis (Chang, 1933)

References

 
True frogs
Amphibians of Asia
Amphibian genera